San Filippo Neri in Eurosia is a 20th-century parochial church and titular church in southern Rome, dedicated to Saint Philip Neri (1515–1595).

History 

San Filippo Neri in Eurosia was built in 1952–55. The title "in Eurosia" refers to the nearby church of Santi Isidoro e Eurosia.

On 7 June 1967, it was made a titular church to be held by a cardinal-deacon. Pope John Paul II visited on 23 February 1986.

Cardinal-Protectors
Alfred Bengsch (1967–1979)
Attilio Nicora (2003–2017)

References

External links

Titular churches
Roman Catholic churches completed in 1956
20th-century Roman Catholic church buildings in Italy
Rome Q. X Ostiense
Romanesque Revival church buildings in Italy